Symmoca signella is a moth of the family Autostichidae. It is found in Spain, France, Germany, Switzerland, Austria, Italy, Slovenia, Croatia and Greece.

References

External links
Images representing Symmoca signella  at Consortium for the Barcode of Life

Moths described in 1796
Symmoca
Moths of Europe
Taxa named by Jacob Hübner